The MC Scow is an American sailing dinghy that was designed as a one-design racer and first built in 1956.

The boat is a development of the John O. Johnson-designed J Scow of the mid-1950s, significantly re-designed by Melges.

Production
The design has been built by Melges Performance Sailboats and Johnson Boat Works in the United States since 1956, with a total of 2,760 boats completed. Johnson went out of business in 1998, but the boat remains in production by Melges.

Design
The MC Scow is a recreational sailboat, with the reverse sheer scow hull built predominantly of fiberglass, with mahogany wood trim. It has a catboat rig with anodized aluminum spars, a transom-hung rudder controlled by a tiller and dual retractable bilgeboards. It displaces .

For sailing the design is equipped with hiking straps and has a mainsail window to improve visibility. It also has a 2:1 mechanical advantage, four-part mainsheet traveler, a Cunningham, a 12:1 boom vang and a 3:1 outhaul.

It is normally raced by a crew of one to three sailors.

Operational history
By 1994 the boat was being raced in 21 fleets in Texas, Georgia, Oklahoma, Missouri, Nebraska, North
Carolina, Michigan, Wisconsin and Iowa. By 2020 it was being raced in over 100 fleets across the United States.

In a 1994 review Richard Sherwood wrote, "single-hander? Catboat? Scow? Well, it has bilgeboards. The
MC can be sailed single-handed, but it is a big boat and will easily carry more ... The MC is perhaps not quite as athletic as most single-handers."

See also
List of sailing boat types

References

External links

Dinghies
Scows
1950s sailboat type designs
Two-person sailboats
Sailboat types built by Johnson Boat Works
Sailboat types built by Melges Performance Sailboats